Dionysos is the second album by the Polish symphonic black metal band Lux Occulta (Latin for "Hidden Light"). The 2002 re-release of the album by Metal Mind includes the band's demo The Forgotten Arts, which can also be found on the band's Maior Arcana compilation, in its entirety as bonus material. Unlike the version on Maior Arcana, the version appended to this album retains the same running order as on the original release.

Track listing
The Birth of the Race (7:39)
Blessed Be the Rain (7:22)
Chalice of Lunar Blood (8:47)
Nocturnal Dithyramb (6:41)
Ecstasy and Terror (9:18)
Upwards to Conquer Heaven (6:51)

Personnel

Lux Occulta
Jaroslaw "Jaro.Slav." Szubrycht: Vocals
Kastor: Guitar 
Vogg (from Polish death metal band Decapitated): Guitar
U.Reck: Keyboards
Martin (also from Decapitated): Bass

Additional Musicians
Jackie: Bass
Kriss: Drums
Flute: Marcin Rumiñski
Female Vocals:  Anna Wesolowska, Wizenna Nowotarska

Production
Executive Producer: Pagan Records
Produced, Engineered, Mixed & Mastered By Andrzej Bomba

References
"Dionysos" by Lux Occulta at discogs: link

2004 albums
Lux Occulta albums